A list of films produced in Brazil in 1950:

See also
 1950 in Brazil

External links
Brazilian films of 1950 at the Internet Movie Database

Brazil
1950
Films